Juan Antonio García Osado (born 7 August 1989) is a Spanish professional footballer who plays as a forward.

Club career
Born in Tarragona, Catalonia, Osado played for hometown side Gimnàstic de Tarragona before moving to FC Barcelona in 2007 to finish his development. However, after just one season in La Masia, he returned to his previous club, being assigned to the farm team CF Pobla de Mafumet.

Osado made his Segunda División debut with Nàstic on 14 December 2008, playing one minute in a 3–1 home win against Sevilla Atlético. It would be his only appearance of the campaign.

In August 2009, Osado signed a contract with UD Logroñés in Segunda División B, where he remained for two and a half seasons. On 11 November 2010 he put the visiting team ahead at Valencia CF for the Copa del Rey, but the hosts eventually won 4–1 and 7–1 on aggregate; in late January 2012 he joined another team in that level, CE L'Hospitalet.

In late July 2013, Osado moved to fellow league club Lleida Esportiu.

References

External links

Blog d l'Hospi profile 

1989 births
Living people
Sportspeople from Tarragona
Spanish footballers
Footballers from Catalonia
Association football forwards
Segunda División players
Segunda División B players
Tercera División players
CF Pobla de Mafumet footballers
Gimnàstic de Tarragona footballers
UD Logroñés players
CE L'Hospitalet players
Lleida Esportiu footballers
CE Sabadell FC footballers
FC Ascó players